Peterolsen Groth Hjalmar Seierstedt Falk (April 2, 1859 – November 2, 1928) was a Norwegian linguist and philologist.

Early life and education
Falk was born in Vang. He started his university studies in 1876 and graduated with an education degree in languages and history in 1882. After this he taught in Oslo while continuing research, especially on Germanic languages and Nordic mythology, including scholarship stays in Germany and England. Falk received the Crown Prince Gold Medal in 1885 and was appointed a docent. He received his doctorate in 1888 with the dissertation Om nomina agentis i det oldnorske Sprog (Nomina Agentis in Old Norwegian).

Academic career
Falk became a professor of Germanic philology at the University of Oslo in 1897. As a university instructor, especially a German instructor, he strove for more practical and modern language teaching. He published a number of works on linguistics, philology, and cultural history, especially in Nordisk Arkiv for Filologi and in materials published by the Norwegian Academy of Science and Letters in Oslo. He is particularly remembered for his etymological dictionary of the Norwegian and Danish language, which he wrote in cooperation with Alf Torp. He chaired the commission that recommended/prepared the orthography revision of 1917. He was decorated Knight, First Class of the Order of St. Olav.

Selected works
 Vanskabninger i det norske sprog, populaere foredrag (Errors in Norwegian, Popular Lectures, 1893)
 Sprogets visne blomster: fortsættelse af "Vanskabninger i det norske sprog." (The Language's Withered Flowers: A Continiation of "Errors in Norwegian", 1894)
 Kulturminder i Ord (Culture Memories in Words, 1900)

Positions and awards
Chair of the Norwegian Students' Society (1895)
Dean of the Faculty of History and Arts (1906–1909)
Election to and chair of the Norwegian Academy of Science and Letters
Knight, First Class of the Order of St. Olav (1911)

See also
 Magnus Olsen

References

1859 births
1928 deaths
Germanic studies scholars
Germanists
Old Norse studies scholars
People from Hamar
Scandinavian studies scholars
Norwegian philologists
Linguists from Norway
Academic staff of the University of Oslo